Duane Bastress (born May 30, 1983) is an American mixed martial artist who last competed in Bellator's Middleweight division.

Background
Born and raised in Pennsylvania, Bastress wrestled for Bloomsburg University of Pennsylvania as a freshman, before transferring to York College of Pennsylvania for his sophomore season. A two-time national champion under coach Tom Kessler, Bastress compiled an overall record of 97-6 at York. He also had an undefeated 40-0 senior season, and held a 65 match winning streak when he graduated. Bastress was later Kessler's assistant for several seasons before ascending to the head coach position.

Mixed martial arts career

Early career
Bastress started his professional career in 2010. He fought primarily for Pennsylvania-based promotion Central Pennsylvania Warrior Challenge, winning three times in a row.

In December 2010 Bastress faced Tim Williams for the middleweight title of Philadelphia's organization Locked in the Cage in a five round bout. He lost the fight at the end of the third round via doctor stoppage.

With a record of three victories and one loss, he signed with Bellator.

Bellator Fighting Championships
Bastress made his debut on October 15, 2011 at Bellator 54 against Daniel Gracie. Bastress won when the doctor deemed Gracie unable to continue due to a cut over his eye at the end of the second round.

Bastress faced Plinio Cruz on April 13, 2012 at Bellator 65. He won via TKO in the second round.

Bastress faced promotional newcomer Jason Butcher on June 22, 2012 at Bellator 71. He had his first defeat in the promotion via submission in the very first round.

Bastress was expected to face Lewis Rumsey on October 19, 2012 at Bellator 77. However, Rumsey was replaced by Ariel Sepulveda due to undisclosed reasons. Bastress defeated Sepulveda via split decision (29-28, 28-29, 29-28).

In May 2013—despite coming off from a win—it was announced that Bellator didn't renew Bastress' contract.

Personal life
Bastress is married and has two daughters; Cora and Audrey and one son, Drake. Bastress' wife, April, was a standout field hockey player for York.

Championships and accomplishments

Amateur wrestling
National Collegiate Athletic Association
NCAA Division III All-American out of York College of Pennsylvania (2005–06)
NCAA Division III 184 lb: Champion out of York College of Pennsylvania (2005–06)
National Wrestling Coaches Association
NWCA Division III National Hall of Fame (2013)

Mixed martial arts record

|-
|Win
|align=center|7–2
|Mike Stewart
|TKO (punches)
|CFFC 26: Sullivan vs. Martinez
|
|align=center|3
|align=center|0:33
|Atlantic City, New Jersey, United States
|
|-
|Win
|align=center|6–2
|Ariel Sepulveda
|Decision (split)
|Bellator 77
|
|align=center|3
|align=center|5:00
|Reading, Pennsylvania, United States
|
|-
|Loss
|align=center|5–2
|Jason Butcher
|Submission (triangle choke)
|Bellator 71
|
|align=center|1
|align=center|1:03
|Chester, West Virginia, United States
|
|-
|Win
|align=center|5–1
|Plinio Cruz
|TKO (punches)
|Bellator 65
|
|align=center|2
|align=center|2:52
|Atlantic City, New Jersey, United States
|
|-
|Win
|align=center|4–1
|Daniel Gracie
|TKO (doctor stoppage)
|Bellator 54
|
|align=center|2
|align=center|5:00
|Atlantic City, New Jersey, United States
|
|-
|Loss
|align=center|3–1
|Tim Williams
|TKO (doctor stoppage)
|Locked in the Cage 6
|
|align=center|3
|align=center|5:00
|Philadelphia, Pennsylvania, United States
|For the LITC middleweight Championship.
|-
|Win
|align=center|3–0
|Roger Minton III
|TKO (punches)
|Central Pennsylvania Warrior Challenge 6
|
|align=center|1
|align=center|0:51
|Lancaster, Pennsylvania, United States
|
|-
|Win
|align=center|2–0
|Robert Morrow
|TKO (punches)
|Central Pennsylvania Warrior Challenge 5
|
|align=center|1
|align=center|2:47
|York, Pennsylvania, United States
|
|-
|Win
|align=center|1–0
|Elder Ramos
|TKO (submission to punches)
|Central Pennsylvania Warrior Challenge 4
|
|align=center|2
|align=center|2:21
|Lancaster, Pennsylvania, United States
|

Mixed martial arts amateur record

|-
|Win
|align=center|2–0
|John Flock
|Decision (unanimous)
|Central Pennsylvania Warrior Challenge 3
|
|align=center|3
|align=center|3:00
|Lancaster, Pennsylvania, United States
|
|-
|Win
|align=center|1–0
|Robert Martin
|Submission (keylock)
|WKU: Warrior Challenge in the Poconos
|
|align=center|1
|align=center|1:18
|Pocono Manor, Pennsylvania, United States
|

References

1983 births
Living people
People from Cumberland County, Pennsylvania
American male sport wrestlers
Amateur wrestlers
American male mixed martial artists
Middleweight mixed martial artists
Mixed martial artists utilizing collegiate wrestling